Allyl acetate is an organic compound with formula C3H5OC(O)CH3.  This colourless liquid is a precursor to especially allyl alcohol, which is a useful industrial intermediate.  It is the acetate ester of allyl alcohol.

Preparation
Allyl acetate is produced industrially by the gas phase reaction of propene in the presence of acetic acid using a palladium catalyst:

C3H6 + CH3COOH + ½ O2 → CH2=CHCH2OCOCH3 + H2O

This method is advantageous because propene is inexpensive and "green." Allyl alcohol is also produced primarily from allyl chloride, but production via the hydrolysis of allyl acetate route avoids the use of chlorine, and so is increasing in use.

Vinyl acetate is produced similarly, using ethylene in place of propene.  These reactions are examples of acetoxylation. The palladium center is then re-oxidized by the O2 present.  The mechanism for the acetoxylation follows a similar pathway, with propene forming a π-allyl bond on the palladium.

Reactions and applications
Allyl acetate can be hydrolyzed to allyl alcohol:
CH2=CHCH2OCOCH3 + H2O → CH2=CHCH2OH + CH3COOH
Allyl alcohol is a precursor for some specialty polymers, mainly for drying oils.  Allyl alcohol is also a precursor to synthetic glycerol.  Epoxidation by hydrogen peroxide produces glycidol, which undergoes hydrolysis to glycerol.  
CH2=CHCH2OH + HOOH → CH2OCHCH2OH + H2O
CH2OCHCH2OH + H2O → C3H5(OH)3

Synthetic glycerol tends to be used in cosmetics and toiletries whereas glycerol from the hydrolysis of fats is used in food.

Substitution reactions
Substitution of the acetate group in allyl acetate using hydrogen chloride yields allyl chloride. Reaction with hydrogen cyanide over copper catalyst yields allyl cyanide.
CH2=CHCH2OCOCH3 + HCl → CH2=CHCH2Cl + CH3COOH
CH2=CHCH2OCOCH3 + HCN → CH2=CHCH2CN + CH3COOH

Allyl chloride is generally produced directly by the chlorination of propene.

References

Acetate esters
Allyl compounds